WLBC may refer to:

Radio and television
 WLBC-FM, an FM radio station in Muncie, Indiana, US
 WLBC-TV, the original name of WIPB, a television station in Muncie, Indiana, US
 WLBC (AM), the original name of WMUN, an AM radio station in Muncie, Indiana, US

Other uses
 UDP-2-acetamido-2-deoxy-ribo-hexuluronate aminotransferase or WlbC, an enzyme
 Word of Life Bible Church, a Pentecostal Christian megachurch located in Warri, Nigeria